Tres Lagos  is a village and municipality in Santa Cruz Province in southern Argentina.

Popular Culture 
The village featured in Top Gear in which Jeremy Clarkson and Richard Hammond head off in search of some bolt cutters after coming across a locked fence.

It is also featured briefly in Long Way Up where the expedition makes an overnight stop.

References

External link

Populated places in Santa Cruz Province, Argentina